USS SC-3, until July 1920 known as USS Submarine Chaser No. 3 or USS S.C. 3, was an SC-1-class submarine chaser built for the United States Navy during World War I.

SC-3 was a wooden-hulled 110-foot (34 m) submarine chaser built at Naval Station New Orleans in New Orleans, Louisiana. She was commissioned on 23 January 1918 as USS Submarine Chaser No. 3, abbreviated at the time as USS S.C. 3.

During World War I, S.C. 3 served on antisubmarine patrol duty in the Special Hunting Squadron,  Group, against German submarines in the Gulf of Mexico, and was based at Key West, Florida.

When the U.S. Navy adopted its modern hull number system on 17 July 1920, Submarine Chaser No. 3 was classified as SC-3 and her name was shortened to USS SC-3.

On 4 October 1920, the Navy sold SC-3 to the Cuba Products Company of New Orleans.

References 
 
 NavSource Online: Submarine Chaser Photo Archive: SC-3
 The Subchaser Archives: The History of U.S. Submarine Chasers in the Great War Hull number: SC-3
 Woofenden, Todd A. Hunters of the Steel Sharks: The Submarine Chasers of World War I. Bowdoinham, Maine: Signal Light Books, 2006. .

SC-1-class submarine chasers
World War I patrol vessels of the United States
Ships built in New Orleans
1918 ships